The 1975 European Amateur Boxing Championships  were held in Spodek, Katowice, Poland from 1 to 8 June. The 21st edition of the bi-annual competition was organised by the European governing body for amateur boxing, EABA. There were 193 fighters from 23 countries participating.

Medal winners

Medal table

External links
Results
Amateur Boxing

European Amateur Boxing Championships
Boxing
European Amateur Boxing Championships
Boxing
Sports competitions in Katowice
European Amateur Boxing
20th century in Katowice